Chunkath Joseph Varkey, KSG (1891–1953), was an Indian professor, journalist and a former Minister for Education of the Madras Presidency.

Biography
Varkey was born in a Syro-Malabar Catholic family in 1891. He was a professor of History St. Aloysius College, Mangalore. He was also the Secretary of the All India Catholic League, now the All India Catholic Union. He represented the West Coast Indian Christian Constituency in the Madras Legislative Assembly during 1937–42. He was also the founder-editor of The Catholic Educational Review. When the C. Rajagopalachari led Indian National Congress took power in the Madras Presidency after winning the 1937 elections, Varkey became Secretary for Education. In 1939 he succeeded Subbarayan as the Minister of Education - a post he held till the resignation of the Congress ministry the same year. He organised the All India Catholic League and was made a Knight of St. Gregory by Pope Pius XI.

References

1891 births
Syro-Malabar Catholics
Indian Eastern Catholics
Saint Thomas Christians
Politicians from Thrissur
University of Madras alumni
Roman Catholic activists
Indian independence activists from Kerala
Indian National Congress politicians from Kerala
Indian National Congress politicians from Tamil Nadu
Indian anti-communists
Malayali politicians
Tamil Nadu ministers
Knights of St. Gregory the Great
1953 deaths
Malayalam-language journalists
Journalists from Kerala